Marcus Peducaeus Plautius Quintillus (died 205) was a Roman noble closely related by birth, adoption, and marriage to the Nerva-Antonine emperors. Through his marriage to Fadilla, the daughter of Emperor Marcus Aurelius and Empress Faustina the Younger, he became the brother-in-law to the future emperor, Commodus. Despite his position, he never became emperor himself. After Commodus was assassinated in 192, he fell out of favor with Septimus Severus during the Year of the Five Emperors. In 205, he committed suicide after Septimus issued an order for his execution.

Early life
Plautius was the son of Ceionia Fabia, the daughter of Lucius Aelius, the first adoptive heir of Hadrian who had died before ascending to the throne; his birth father is believed to be Plautius Quintillus, consul in 159. At some point, he was adopted as the heir of Marcus Peducaeus Stloga Priscinus, consul in 141. Through his adopted father, as well as his natural father and mother, he could claim descent from families of the highest nobility.

Antonine era
When Plautius married Annia Aurelia Fadilla, he became son-in-law to Marcus Aurelius and brother-in-law to Commodus. They had two children: a son, (Plautius) Quintillus, and a daughter, Plautia Servilla.  In 177, Plautius served as ordinary consul as the colleague of Commodus, and then again with Commodus at an unknown date in his reign (180-192). Plautius was also an Augur. When Marcus Aurelius died in 180, Commodus succeeded him, and Plautius was one of his main advisers.

Year of the Five Emperors
After the assassination of Commodus, in December 192, the civil war that ensued saw five different men assume the throne; Plautius was not one of them. When Septimus Severus, the victor of the civil war, advanced on Rome, Didius Julianus proposed that the Senate and the Vestal Virgins meet Severus' advancing army as supplicants, a proposal Plautius intervened forcefully against.   

Plautius afterwards retired to his country villa. In 205, he was the target of a delator or informer, and Septimus ordered his execution. When he heard of the order, Plautius called for his funeral shroud. "What is this?" Plautius asked, observing how tattered it had become with age, "we are late!" Then preparing to take his own life, he burned incense before uttering his last words: "I make the same prayer that Servianus made for Hadrian" — that is, that Severus would one day wish to die, but would be unable to. It is unknown whether Fadilla was still alive then.

References

Sources
 Albino Garzetti, From Tiberius to the Antonines: a history of the Roman Empire AD 14-192 (1974)
 Alan K. Bowman, Peter Garnsey, Dominic Rathbone, The Cambridge ancient history, Volume 11, second edition (2000)
 Livius article on Fadilla

2nd-century births
205 deaths
Imperial Roman consuls
2nd-century Romans
3rd-century Romans
Peducaei
Plautii
Nerva–Antonine dynasty
Ancient Roman politicians who committed suicide
Politicians from Rome
Ancient Roman adoptees